The W. H. Coffin House, located at 421 E. 11th Ave. in Winfield in Cowley County, Kansas, was listed on the National Register of Historic Places in 2003.

Built in 1892, the W. H. Coffin House is an example of  Queen Anne style architecture in the United States  popular from about 1880 to 1900.

It is a two-story cedar weatherboard-clad frame house upon a limestone foundation.  It has gables with fish scale shingles made from cedar.

References

Houses on the National Register of Historic Places in Kansas
Queen Anne architecture in Kansas
Houses completed in 1892
Cowley County, Kansas